The 2013 Magyar Kupa, known as ( for sponsorship reasons), is the 87th edition of the tournament.

Quarter-finals

Quarter-final matches were played on 14 and 15 September 2013.

|}

Final four

The final four will be held on 16 and 17 November 2013 at the Vizilabda Aréna (Tiszaligeti uszoda) in Szolnok.

Semi-finals

Final

See also
 2013–14 Országos Bajnokság I

References

External links
 Hungarian Water Polo Federaration 

Seasons in Hungarian water polo competitions
Hungary
Magyar Kupa